The Decian persecution of Christians occurred in 250 AD under the Roman Emperor Decius. He had issued an edict ordering everyone in the Empire to perform a sacrifice to the Roman gods and the well-being of the emperor. The sacrifices had to be performed in the presence of a Roman magistrate, and be confirmed by a signed and witnessed certificate from the magistrate. Although the text of the edict has been lost, many examples of the certificates have survived.

Decius' edict was intended to act as an Empire-wide loyalty oath to the new emperor (who had come to power in 249 AD), sanctified through the Roman religion. Christian monotheistic beliefs did not allow them to worship any other gods, so they were forced to choose between their religious beliefs and following the decree.

An unknown number of Christians were executed or died in prison for refusing to perform the sacrifices, including Pope Fabian. Others went into hiding, whilst many apostatized and performed the ceremonies. The effects on Christians were long-lasting: it caused tension between those who had performed the sacrifices (or fled) and those who had not, and left bitter memories of persecution.

Background 
Decius became Roman emperor in 249 as a result of military victories. He made efforts to revive Rome's "Golden Age", adding the name of one of his most admired predecessors, Trajan, to his own, revived the ancient office of censor and restored the Colosseum. Restoration of traditional Roman piety was another of his aims, and after performing the annual sacrifice to Jupiter on January 3, 250, he issued an edict, the text of which is lost, ordering sacrifices to the gods to be made throughout the Empire. Jews were specifically exempted from this requirement.

Requirements of the edict 

The edict ordered that everyone in the Empire, with the exception of Jews, must sacrifice and burn incense to the gods and to the well-being of the Emperor in the presence of a Roman magistrate, and get a written certificate, called a libellus, that this had been done, signed by the magistrate and witnesses. Numerous examples of these libelli survive from Egypt, for instance:To the commission chosen to superintend the sacrifices. From Aurelia Ammonous, daughter of Mystus, of the Moeris quarter, priestess of the god Petesouchos, the great, the mighty, the immortal, and priestess of the gods in the Moeris quarter. I have sacrificed to the gods all my life, and now again, in accordance with the decree and in your presence, I have made sacrifice, and poured a libation, and partaken of the sacred victims. I request you to certify this below.

Exemption of the Jews 
Julius Caesar had formulated a policy of allowing Jews to follow their traditional religious practices, a policy which was followed, and extended, by Augustus. This gave Judaism the status of a religio licita (permitted religion) throughout the Empire.
Roman authorities respected tradition in religion and the Jews were following the beliefs and practices of their ancestors. It was well understood that Jews would not perform sacrifices to the Roman gods or burn incense before an image of the Emperor. In contrast, the Christians were a new phenomenon, and one that did not seem like a religion to Roman authorities at all; both the earliest extant Roman references to Christianity, Pliny the Younger and Tacitus in his Annals about 116, refer to Christianity as superstitio, excessive and non-traditional religiosity that was socially disruptive. Christians had abandoned the religion of their forefathers, and were seeking to convert others, which seemed dangerous to the Romans; refusal to sacrifice for the Emperor's well-being appeared seditious.

Effects of the edict on Christians 
Christians were prohibited by their faith from worshipping the Roman gods or burning incense before an image of the Emperor. Refusal resulted in the deaths of some notable Christians, including Pope Fabian, Babylas of Antioch and Alexander of Jerusalem.  The numbers of people put to death for refusing to obtain a certificate is unknown. Large numbers of Christians performed the sacrifices as required, so much so that authorities at Carthage were overwhelmed by the numbers seeking a certificate and were forced to issue a notice requesting people to come back the next day. Many other Christians also went into hiding, especially in Egypt, Africa and Anatolia, including Dionisius of Alexandria and Cyprianus of Carthage.

After the edict 
The effects of the edict on Christian communities, many of which had until then lived peacefully and undisturbed, was traumatic. Many lapsed in their faith, and their readmission into the Christian community was opposed by the schismatic Novatian. By 251, efforts to enforce the edict had died down, and although short-lived, the "Decian persecution" became in the collective memory of the church an episode of monstrous tyranny.

Decius died in June 251, causing his edict to lapse; it had been in force for approximately eighteen months. Deliberate persecution of Christians within the empire began in 257 AD under emperor Valerian, and intensified in 303 AD during the Diocletianic Persecution.

See also
Persecution of Christians in the Roman Empire

References 

Persecution of early Christians
3rd-century Christianity
250
250s in the Roman Empire
Decian dynasty